"Whispering Bells" is a song performed by The Del-Vikings (a.k.a. the Dell-Vikings). It reached #5 on the U.S. R&B chart and #9 on the U.S. pop chart in 1957. Kripp Johnson was the lead vocalist on this recording. Clarence E. Quick, who was the bass vocalist in the group, wrote the song.

The song ranked #49 on Billboard's Year-End top 50 singles of 1957.

Other versions
The Mighty Echoes released a version of the song on their 2006 album A Cappella Cool.
Jesse Winchester released a version of the song on his 2014 album A Reasonable Amount of Trouble.

In popular culture
The Del-Vikings' version of "Whispering Bells" was featured in the 1986 film Stand by Me and was included in the film's soundtrack.

References

1957 songs
1957 singles
The Del-Vikings songs
Joan Baez songs
Paul Simon songs
Song recordings produced by Paul Simon
Dot Records singles